Reo Nishida (西田 玲雄, Nishida Reo, born 16 July 2000) is a Japanese diver. He competed in the 2020 Summer Olympics.

References

2000 births
Living people
Japanese male divers
Olympic divers of Japan
Divers at the 2020 Summer Olympics
21st-century Japanese people